Güngör Şahinkaya (born 1 August 1954) is a Turkish former professional footballer best known for his years with Trabzonspor from 1976 to 1986.

International career
Şahinkaya represented the Turkey national football team six times. Şahinkaya debuted for Turkey in a friendly 3-0 win over Saudi Arabia on 10 March 1980.

Personal life
Şahinkaya was one of 7 children, 6 sons and 1 daughter. His father İbrahim and eldest brother Yılmaz were amateur footballers in their youth. His brothers Coşkun and Bülent were professional footballers who also played for Trabzonspor.

Honours
Trabzonspor
 Süper Lig: 1975-76, 1976-77, 1978-79, 1979-1980, 1980-81, 1983-84
 Turkish Cup: 1976-77, 1977-78, 1983-84
 Turkish Super Cup: 1975-76, 1976-77, 1978-79, 1979-1980, 1982-83
 Prime Minister's Cup: 1977-78, 1984-85

References

External links
TFF Profile

1954 births
Living people
Sportspeople from Trabzon
Turkish footballers
Turkey international footballers
Association football midfielders
Süper Lig players
Trabzonspor footballers
Zonguldakspor footballers